Peter Hastings Falk (born 1950) is an American art historian, advisor and publisher.

Falk is a graduate of Brown University (Art History, 1973) and of the Rhode Island School of Design (Architecture, 1976). In 1993 Falk began publishing Art Price Index International. In 1996 he became Editor-in-Chief of ArtNet and later Editor-in-Chief of AskArt. Since 2000, he has been Consulting Editor to Artprice. He publishes reference books on American art under his Falk Art Reference imprint (formerly Sound View Press). He is also a professional appraiser.

Works
The Photographic Art Market (1981-on). The first index to photographs sold at auction, which evolved into
Print Price Index (1991–93). Index to fine prints sold at auction, which evolved into
Art Price Index International (1993–1999), which was subsumed by Artprice.com
Who Was Who in American Art (1999). 3 vols.  Winner of the Wittenborn Award for Best Art Reference book published in North America, awarded by ARLIS.

References

External links

1950 births
Living people
American art historians
Brown University alumni
Rhode Island School of Design alumni